Gang Mi-yeong (born 3 October 1978) is a South Korean speed skater. She competed at the 1994 Winter Olympics and the 1998 Winter Olympics.

References

1978 births
Living people
South Korean female speed skaters
Olympic speed skaters of South Korea
Speed skaters at the 1994 Winter Olympics
Speed skaters at the 1998 Winter Olympics
Speed skaters at the 1996 Asian Winter Games
20th-century South Korean women